Caesar B. F. Barra (February 3, 1880 – September 29, 1949) was an Italian-American lawyer and politician from New York.

Life 
Barra was born on February 3, 1880, in Salerno, Italy. He immigrated to America with his mother when he was seven.

Barra attended the College of the City of New York and New York University Law School. He was admitted to the bar in 1901 and practiced law with Ambrose H. Purdy and James A. Delehanty, who by 1916 was Judge of the Court of General Sessions in New York County. Barra later practiced law with his brother Ralph J. in 15 Park Row. Over the years, he defended over 200 people tried of murder and was first counsel for Alvin J. Paris after he was accused of bribing the New York Giants in 1946.

In 1915, Barra was elected to the New York State Assembly as a Democrat, representing the New York County 3rd District. He served in the Assembly in 1916, 1917, 1918, 1919, and 1920.

Barra was president of the Criminal Courts Bar Association and a member of the Grand Street Boys Association. He was married to Rose M. Struzzieri. They had a daughter, Mrs. Estelle Favazza.

Barra died at his home in Brooklyn on September 29, 1949. He was buried in Calvary Cemetery.

References

External links 

 The Political Graveyard

1880 births
1949 deaths
People from Salerno
Italian emigrants to the United States
American people of Italian descent
City College of New York alumni
New York University School of Law alumni
20th-century American lawyers
Lawyers from Brooklyn
Politicians from Manhattan
20th-century American politicians
Democratic Party members of the New York State Assembly
Burials at Calvary Cemetery (Queens)